Bethesda Magazine is a bimonthly magazine distributed in Montgomery County, Maryland which began in 2004. It is named after the prosperous suburban area Bethesda, Maryland. The magazine was founded by Steve Hull. Despite its name, the magazine also covers areas like Chevy Chase, Gaithersburg, Kensington, Potomac, Rockville, and Silver Spring.

In April 2015 Bethesda Magazine acquired an online news provider, Bethesda Now, and integrated it into its website. The magazine's core focuses are local feature journalism, guide book-style articles, and real estate advice magazine.

In March 2021 Hull announced that he had sold Bethesda Magazine and its online news service, Bethesda Beat, to Scott and Jillian Copeland of Rockville, Maryland. Scott is a principal of RST Development LLC, a mid-Atlantic developer of multifamily market-rate and affordable housing. Jillian is involved in the local nonprofit and philanthropy community, and has led efforts to build housing that aims to be more inclusive, including to allow those with special needs live independently.

References

External links
 
 Washington Post article about the magazine

Local interest magazines published in the United States
Magazines established in 2004
Magazines published in Maryland